Alvariella is a monotypic genus of air-breathing land snails, terrestrial gastropod mollusks in the family Orculidae. The sole species in the genus is Alvariella multiplicata Hausdorf 1996.

References

Orculidae